Agninakshathram may refer to:

 Agninakshathram (1977 film), Malayalam film released in 1978 starring Mohan and Lakshmi
 Agninakshathram (2004 film), Malayalam film released in 2004 starring Suresh Gopi and Indraja